Booth Branch is a  long 1st order tributary to White Marsh Branch in Kent County, Delaware.

Course
Booth Branch rises about 1.5 miles northwest of Greenwood, Delaware in Kent County and then flows southeast to join White Marsh Branch about 1 mile north of Greenwood.

Watershed
Booth Branch drains  of area, receives about 45.3 in/year of precipitation, has a topographic wetness index of 667.75 and is about 3% forested.

See also
List of Delaware rivers

References

Rivers of Delaware
Rivers of Kent County, Delaware
Tributaries of the Nanticoke River